Halastó is a village in Hungary, Western Transdanubia, Vas county, Körmendi subregion. As of 2008, the population of the village is 108 people. Area of the village is 5.65 km².

References

Populated places in Vas County